Punnulal Mohle (born 2 January 1952) is an Indian politician from Chhattisgarh and a member of the Bharatiya Janata Party. He was Minister of Food, Civil Supply, Consumer Protection in Government of Chhattisgarh. Prior to becoming Minister, he also represented Bilaspur in Lok Sabha and was a legislator in Madhya Pradesh Legislative Assembly.

He never lost any election after becoming a legislator in Madhya Pradesh Legislative Assembly.

References

External links
 Home Page on the Parliament of India's Website

1952 births
Bharatiya Janata Party politicians from Chhattisgarh
Living people
India MPs 2004–2009
Lok Sabha members from Chhattisgarh
India MPs 1996–1997
India MPs 1998–1999
India MPs 1999–2004
Chhattisgarh MLAs 2018–2023